Orah (Serbo-Croatian for "walnut") may refer to:

Places
Bosnia and Herzegovina
 Orah, Bileća, a village in Bileća, Republika Srpska
 Orah, Rudo, a village in Rudo, Republika Srpska
 Orah, Ravno, a village in Ravno, Federation of Bosnia and Herzegovina
 Orah, Vareš, a village in Vareš, Federation of Bosnia and Herzegovina
 Orah Lake, a lake of Bosnia and Herzegovina

Croatia
 Orah, Vrgorac, a village in Vrgorac

Montenegro
 Orah, Berane, a village in Berane
 Orah, Nikšić, a village in Nikšić

North Macedonia
 Orah, Staro Nagoričane, a village

Other uses
 ORaH, Croatian Sustainable Development, a green political party in Croatia
 Orah Dee Clark (1875–1965), American educator
 Michael Orah (born 1985), Indonesian footballer